Karl Johan Baadsvik (22 August 1910 – 5 October 1995) was a Canadian skier, born in Hitra, Norway. He competed in ski jumping, cross-country skiing, Nordic combined, and alpine skiing at the 1936 Winter Olympics in Garmisch-Partenkirchen.

References

1910 births
1995 deaths
People from Hitra
Norwegian emigrants to Canada
Canadian male ski jumpers
Canadian male cross-country skiers
Canadian male Nordic combined skiers
Canadian male alpine skiers
Olympic ski jumpers of Canada
Olympic cross-country skiers of Canada
Olympic Nordic combined skiers of Canada
Olympic alpine skiers of Canada
Ski jumpers at the 1936 Winter Olympics
Cross-country skiers at the 1936 Winter Olympics
Nordic combined skiers at the 1936 Winter Olympics
Alpine skiers at the 1936 Winter Olympics